Harrel is a surname. It may refer to the following notable people:

 David Harrel (1841–1939), Irish police officer and civil servant
 Donny Harrel (born 1969), American college baseball coach
 Rod Harrel (born 1960), American actor, writer, and director
 Frédérique Harrel, London-based fashion blogger

See also
Harrell (name), given name and surname